Riolama is a small genus of lizards in the family Gymnophthalmidae.

Geographic range
The genus Riolama found in Venezuela and Brazil.

Species
The genus Riolama contains 6 species:
Riolama grandis 
Riolama inopinata 
Riolama leucosticta  - white-spotted riolama
Riolama luridiventris 
Riolama stellata 
Riolama uzzelli 

Nota bene: A binomial authority in parentheses indicates that the species was originally described in a genus other than Riolama.

Relatives of the Riolama, nicknamed "The Night Sky" and "The Brown Giant" were discovered by scientists in the Pico da Neblina National Park, Brazil in 2018.

References

Further reading
Uzzell T (1973). "A Revision of Lizards of the Genus Prionodactylus, with a New Genus for P. leucostictus and Notes on the Genus Euspondylus (Sauria, Teiidae)". Postilla, Peabody Mus., Yale Univ. (159): 1-67. (Riolama, new genus, pp. 52–55).

 
Lizard genera
Taxa named by Thomas Marshall Uzzell, Jr.